Tapheocarpa is a genus of monocotyledonous flowering plants in the family Commelinaceae, first described as a genus in 1994. The genus consists of a single known species, Tapheocarpa calandrinioides, endemic to the State of Queensland in Australia.

References

External links
Atlas of Living Australia

Commelinaceae
Monotypic Commelinales genera
Flora of Queensland
Endemic flora of Australia